Wáǵay, is the name of the sixth month of the Afghan calendar. It occurs in the late summer season (from August 22/23 to September 21/22) and contains 31 days.

Wáǵay corresponds with the tropical Zodiac sign Virgo. Wáǵay literally means "virgin" in Pashto.

Observances 
 Independence Day of Ukraine - 2 Waǵay
 Independence Day (Malaysia) - 9 Waǵay
 Victory over Japan Day - 11 Waǵay
 Martyrs' Day (Afghanistan) - 18 Wagay
 Mexican Independence Day and Malaysia Day - 25 Waǵay
 United States Air Force Day and Chilean Independence Day - 27-28 Waǵay
 Chilean Army Day - 28-29 Waǵay

References 

Pashto names for the months of the Solar Hijri calendar

ps:وږی(مياشت)